In number theory, the integer square root (isqrt) of a non-negative integer n is the non-negative integer m which is the greatest integer less than or equal to the square root of n,

 

For example,

Introductory remark
Let  and  be non-negative integers.

Algorithms that compute (the decimal representation of)  run forever on each input  which is not a perfect square.

Algorithms that compute  do not run forever. They are nevertheless capable of computing  up to any desired accuracy .

Choose any  and compute .

For example (setting ):

Compare the results with 

It appears that the multiplication of the input by  gives an accuracy of  decimal digits.

Assume that in the next program the procedure  is already defined and — for the sake of the argument — that all variables can hold integers of unlimited magnitude.

// Print sqrt(y), without halting
void sqrtForever(unsigned int y)
{
	unsigned int result = isqrt(y);
	printf("%d.", result);	// print result, followed by a decimal point

	while (true)	// repeat forever ...
	{
		y = y * 100;	// theoretical example: overflow is ignored
		result = isqrt(y);
		printf("%d", result % 10);	// print last digit of result
	}
}

The conclusion is that algorithms which compute isqrt() are computationally equivalent to algorithms which compute sqrt().

Basic algorithms
The integer square root of a non-negative integer  can be defined as

For example,  because .

Algorithm using linear search
The following C-programs are straightforward implementations.

Linear search ...

... using addition
In the program above (linear search, ascending) one can replace multiplication by addition, using the equivalence
.

// Integer square root
// (linear search, ascending) using addition
unsigned int isqrt(unsigned int y)
{
	unsigned int L = 0;
	unsigned int a = 1;
	unsigned int d = 3;

	while (a <= y)
	{
		a = a + d;	// (a + 1) ^ 2
		d = d + 2;
		L = L + 1;
	}

	return L;
}

Algorithm using binary search
Linear search sequentially checks every value until it hits the smallest  where .

A speed-up is achieved by using binary search instead.
The following C-program is an implementation. 

// Integer square root (using binary search)
unsigned int isqrt(unsigned int y)
{
	unsigned int L = 0;
	unsigned int M;
	unsigned int R = y + 1;

    while (L != R - 1)
    {
        M = (L + R) / 2;

		if (M * M <= y)
			L = M;
		else
			R = M;
	}

    return L;
}

Numerical example

For example, if one computes  using binary search, one obtains the  sequence

This computation takes 21 iteration steps, whereas linear search (ascending, starting from ) needs  steps.

Algorithm using Newton's method

 

Stopping criterion
One can prove that  is the largest possible number for which the stopping criterion 

ensures 
in the algorithm above.

In implementations which use number formats that cannot represent all rational numbers exactly (for example, floating point), a stopping constant less than one should be used to protect against roundoff errors.

Domain of computation
Although  is irrational for many , the sequence  contains only rational terms when  is rational. Thus, with this method it is unnecessary to exit the field of rational numbers in order to calculate , a fact which has some theoretical advantages.

Using only integer division
For computing  for very large integers n, one can use the quotient of Euclidean division for both of the division operations.  This has the advantage of only using integers for each intermediate value, thus making the use of floating point representations of large numbers unnecessary.  It is equivalent to using the iterative formula

 

By using the fact that

 

one can show that this will reach  within a finite number of iterations.

So in the integer version, one has  and 
until the final solution  is reached.

However,  is not necessarily a fixed point of the above iterative formula. Indeed, it can be shown that  is a fixed point if and only if  is not a perfect square.

Example implementation in C 
// Square root of integer
unsigned int int_sqrt(unsigned int s)
{
	// Zero yields zero
    // One yields one
	if (s <= 1) 
		return s;

    // Initial estimate (must be too high)
	unsigned int x0 = s / 2;

	// Update
	unsigned int x1 = (x0 + s / x0) / 2;

	while (x1 < x0)	// Bound check
	{
		x0 = x1;
		x1 = (x0 + s / x0) / 2;
	}		
	return x0;
}

Numerical example 

For example, if one computes the integer square root of  using the algorithm above, one obtains the sequence

In total 13 iteration steps are needed. Although Heron's method converges quadratically close to the solution, less than one bit precision per iteration is gained at the beginning. This means that the choice of the initial estimate is critical for the performance of the algorithm.

When a fast computation for the integer part of the binary logarithm or for the bit-length is available (like e.g. std::bit_width in C++20), one should better start at 
,
.
In this case only 4 iteration steps are needed.

Digit-by-digit algorithm

The traditional pen-and-paper algorithm for computing the square root  is based on working from higher digit places to lower, and as each new digit pick the largest that will still yield a square . If stopping after the one's place, the result computed will be the integer square root.

Using bitwise operations

If working in base 2, the choice of digit is simplified to that between 0 (the "small candidate") and 1 (the "large candidate"), and digit manipulations can be expressed in terms of binary shift operations. With * being multiplication, << being left shift, and >> being logical right shift, a recursive algorithm to find the integer square root of any natural number is:

def integer_sqrt(n: int) -> int:
    assert n >= 0, "sqrt works for only non-negative inputs"
    if n < 2:
        return n

    # Recursive call:
    small_cand = integer_sqrt(n >> 2) << 1
    large_cand = small_cand + 1
    if large_cand * large_cand > n:
        return small_cand
    else:
        return large_cand

# equivalently:
def integer_sqrt_iter(n: int) -> int:
    assert n >= 0, "sqrt works for only non-negative inputs"
    if n < 2:
        return n

    # Find the shift amount. See also [[find first set]],
    # shift = ceil(log2(n) * 0.5) * 2 = ceil(ffs(n) * 0.5) * 2
    shift = 2
    while (n >> shift) != 0:
        shift += 2

    # Unroll the bit-setting loop.
    result = 0
    while shift >= 0:
        result = result << 1
        large_cand = (
            result + 1
        )  # Same as result ^ 1 (xor), because the last bit is always 0.
        if large_cand * large_cand <= n >> shift:
            result = large_cand
        shift -= 2

    return result

Traditional pen-and-paper presentations of the digit-by-digit algorithm include various optimisations not present in the code above, in particular the trick of presubtracting the square of the previous digits which makes a general multiplication step unnecessary. See  for an example.

In programming languages

Some programming languages dedicate an explicit operation to the integer square root calculation in addition to the general case or can be extended by libraries to this end.

 (isqrt x): Common Lisp.
 math.isqrt(x): Python.

See also 
 Methods of computing square roots

Notes

External links

Number theoretic algorithms
Number theory
Root-finding algorithms